The 45th Annual Annie Awards honoring excellence in the field of animation of 2017 took place on February 3, 2018, at the University of California, Los Angeles's Royce Hall in Los Angeles, California, and presented awards in 35 categories.

Production categories

On December 4, 2017, the nominations were announced. Coco earned the most number of nominations with 13, followed by The Breadwinner with 10.

Individual achievement categories

Multiple awards and nominations

Films

The following films received multiple nominations:

The following films received multiple awards:

Television/Broadcast

The following television productions received multiple nominations:

The following television productions received multiple awards:

References

External links
 Complete list of 45th Annual Annie Awards nominees

2017
Annie
Annie
Annie
Annie